Malin is a city in Klamath County, Oregon, United States. The population was 805 at the 2010 census.

History
According to Lewis A. McArthur, Malin was settled September 30, 1909, on land that was formerly at the bottom of Tule Lake by 65 Bohemian families who named the new town for the Czech town Malin, now part of Kutná Hora. The settlers had found a large horseradish, and Malin is famous for that plant. McArthur also alludes to the discovery of fossils near Malin in 1925. Many surviving descendants of these original Czech families still call Malin home and maintain family farms.

Geography
It is along a spur of Oregon Route 39, southeast of Klamath Falls, east of Merrill, and northeast of Tulelake. Lava Beds National Monument is to the south, nearby in California.

Climate
This region experiences warm (but not hot) and dry summers, with no average monthly temperatures above 71.6 °F.  According to the Köppen Climate Classification system, Malin has a warm-summer Mediterranean climate, abbreviated "Csb" on climate maps. Due to its relatively aridity, Malin nearly qualifies as having a steppe climate (Köppen BSk)

Demographics

2010 census
As of the census of 2010, there were 805 people, 255 households, and 194 families residing in the city. The racial makeup of the city was 70.6% White, 1.1% Native American, 25.7% from other races, and 2.6% from two or more races. Hispanic or Latino of any race were 57.8% of the population.

There were 255 households, of which 49.4% had children under the age of 18 living with them, 57.6% were married couples living together, 11.8% had a female householder with no husband present, 6.7% had a male householder with no wife present, and 23.9% were non-families. 19.2% of all households were made up of individuals, and 8.6% had someone living alone who was 65 years of age or older. The average household size was 3.16 and the average family size was 3.66.

The median age in the city was 29.1 years. 33.3% of residents were under the age of 18; 12.3% were between the ages of 18 and 24; 24.6% were from 25 to 44; 19.1% were from 45 to 64; and 10.7% were 65 years of age or older. The gender makeup of the city was 52.5% male and 47.5% female.

2000 census
As of the census of 2000, there were 638 people, 200 households, and 155 families residing in the city. The population density was 1,810.4 people per square mile (703.8/km2). There were 217 housing units at an average density of 615.8 per square mile (239.4/km2). The racial makeup of the city was 63.32% White, 0.63% African American, 2.19% Native American, 0.63% Pacific Islander, 31.03% from other races. About 2% were of two or more races. About 54% were Hispanic or Latino of any race.

There were 200 households, out of which 48.5% had children under the age of 18 living with them, 58.5% were married couples living together, 10.5% had a female householder with no husband present, 22.5% were non-families. Twenty percent of all households were made up of individuals. About 10% had someone living alone who was 65 years of age or older.

The average household size was 3.19 and the average family size was 3.61. The age distribution was 36.4% under the age of 18, 9.9% from 18 to 24, 27.4% from 25 to 44, 16.5% from 45 to 64, and 9.9% who were 65 years of age or older. The median age was 28 years. For every 100 females, there were 109.2 males. For every 100 females age 18 and over, there were 106.1 males.

The median income for a household in the city was $29,750, and the median income for a family was $30,000. Males had a median income of $26,875 versus $21,591 for females. The per capita income for the city was $10,258. About 19.4% of families and 26.7% of the population were below the poverty line, including 38.1% of those under age 18 and none of those age 65 or over.

Economy and infrastructure

As of 2002, the three largest employers in Malin were the Circle C (potato shed), Baley Troutman (farm), and Cy's Market (grocery store).

The "Malin Substation", an electrical substation owned by PG&E, PacifiCorp, and BPA, forms the northern end of Path 66, a major north-south power transmission corridor.

Near Malin are several natural gas interconnects: The Malin Interconnect connects Gas Transmission Northwest with Pacific Gas & Electric's Redwood Path. The Onyx Hills interconnect connects the Ruby Pipeline with Pacific Gas & Electric's Redwood Path. The third interconnect is between the Tuscarora and GTN. If built, the Pacific Connector Gas Pipeline would connect this nexus of natural gas facilities to the future Jordan Cove LNG terminal.

Transportation
 Malin Airport

References

External links
 Entry for Malin in the Oregon Blue Book

Cities in Oregon
Czech-American history
Czech-American culture in Oregon
Cities in Klamath County, Oregon
Populated places established in 1909
1909 establishments in Oregon